Richard Larson may refer to:

 Richard Larson (academic) (born 1943), American professor of operations research
 Richard R. Larson (Wyoming politician) (1928–2016), American politician in the state of Wyoming
 Richard R. Larson (Illinois politician) (1907–1985), American politician in the state of Illinois

See also
 Richard Larsen (disambiguation)